was a Japanese LDP politician and dietman. He was best known as an influential supporter of Kakuei Tanaka's faction, though had to retire early from politics in 1990 due to diabetes.

He is to be distinguished from the homonymous Kōzō Watanabe (Democratic Party politician) (different given name characters 渡部恒三) who was nicknamed "Kennedy" in the diet, while Kozo Watanabe (born 1942) was known as the spokesman of the Etsuzankai (:ja:越山会) associated with Kakuei Tanaka.

He was elected in Niigata Prefecture's 2nd Electoral District in 1972 and served in vice-minister posts at the Ministry of Posts and Telecommunications (Japan) and the Ministry of Construction (Japan).

References

1942 births
2007 deaths
Japanese politicians